

References

Islands
 
New Hampshire